Balaenicipitidae is a family of birds in the order Pelecaniformes, although it was traditionally placed in Ciconiiformes. The shoebill is the sole extant species and its closest relative is the hamerkop (Scopus umbretta), which belongs to another family.

It has the following genera:

Balaeniceps
†Goliathia (might belong in Balaeniceps)
†Paludiavis

Common characteristics 
A sharp hooked tip to the upper beak

A furrow in the upper beak below the nasal openings

An ossified septum

Vestigial or absent expansor secundariorum muscle

References

Bird families
Taxa named by Charles Lucien Bonaparte